The 1962 United States Senate election in Illinois was held on November 6, 1962 to elect one of Illinois's members to the United States Senate. Incumbent Republican U.S. Senator and Minority Leader Everett Dirksen won re-election to his third term.

Election information
The primaries and general election coincided with those for congress and state elections.

Primaries were held on April 10.

Turnout
Turnout in the primary elections was 33.36%, with a total of 1,815,849 votes cast.

Turnout during the general election was 72.66%, with 3,709,209 votes cast.

Democratic primary

Republican primary

General election
Dirksen carried 86 of the state's 102 counties. Among the counties that Yates carried over Dirksen was the state's most populous county, Cook County, in which Yates won with 51.30% to Dirksen's 48.70%.  52.97% of all votes cast in the election were from Cook County. In the combined vote of the state's other 101 counties, Dirksen won 57.58% to Yates' 42.43%.

See also 
 1962 United States Senate elections

References 

Illinois
United States Senate
United States Senate elections in Illinois